Bakhchi (Baqsa) is a rural locality (a village) in Alkinsky Selsoviet, Chishminsky District, Bashkortostan, Russia. The population was 88 as of 2010. There is 1 street.

Geography 
Bakhchi is located 23 km northeast of Chishmy (the district's administrative centre) by road. Uzytamak is the nearest rural locality.

References 

Rural localities in Chishminsky District